The  University of Mines and Technology (UMaT) is a public university located at Tarkwa in the Western Region of Ghana.

History 

UMaT was first established as the Tarkwa Technical Institute in 1952. In 1961, the university was changed to the Tarkwa School of Mines to help train manpower for the mining industry in Ghana. UMaT became a faculty of the Kwame Nkrumah University of Science and Technology (KNUST) in 1976. On 1 October 2001, UMaT was elevated to university college status and was known as the Western University College of KNUST. UMaT became a fully fledged University in November 2004 by act of Parliament (Act 677). In 2008, the first batch of Students graduated in Tarkwa without going to KNUST for the ceremony. On January 12, 2018, the university was renamed to George Grant University of Mines and Technology in honour of Paa Grant.

Faculties

Faculty of Engineering
The faculty of engineering has the following departments:
 Department of Electrical and Electronic Engineering
 Department of Mechanical Engineering
 Department of Mathematics
 Department of Computer Science and Engineering
 Department of Renewable Energy Engineering

Faculty of Mineral Resources Technology
The faculty of mineral resources technology is the only such one in the West Africa sub-region for training high-level personnel in the mineral industry and continues to attract students from countries in the sub-region and across the Africa continent. The Faculty consists of six (6) Academic Departments which offer the four-year BSc programmes in:
 Department of Geological Engineering
 Department of Geomatic Engineering
 Department of Mineral Engineering
 Department of Mining Engineering
 Department of Petroleum Engineering
 Department of Environmental and Safety Engineering

Faculty of Integrated Management Science 

The Faculty of Integrated Management Science came into operations at the beginning of the 2017/2018 Academic Year. The Faculty consists of two academic departments, namely: 
Department of Technical Communication
Department of Management Studies

School of Postgraduate Studies 

All postgraduate programmes of study in the university may require course work together with research work, leading to the award of the following:

Postgraduate Diploma (PgD)
Master of Science (MSc)
Master of Philosophy (MPhil)
Doctor of Philosophy (PhD)

Past Principals and Vice Chancellors 
Prof. J.S.Y. Kuma (Vice Chancellor)
Prof. Daniel Mireku-Gyimah (Vice Chancellor)
Dr. John Kofi Borsah (Principal)
Mr. Michael Tettey Kofi
Mr. F. W. Philpott

See also
 List of universities in Ghana

References

External links
 Official Website
 National Accreditation Board, Ghana 

Educational institutions established in 2001

1952 establishments in Gold Coast (British colony)
Education in the Western Region (Ghana)